Glucosidases are the glycoside hydrolase enzymes categorized under the EC number 3.2.1.

Function
Alpha-glucosidases are enzymes involved in breaking down complex carbohydrates such as starch and glycogen into their monomers.

They catalyze the cleavage of individual glucosyl residues from various glycoconjugates including alpha- or beta-linked polymers of glucose. This enzyme convert complex sugars into simpler ones.

Members
Different sources include different members in this class. Members marked with a "#" are considered by MeSH to be glucosidases.

Clinical significance
Alpha-glucosidases are targeted by alpha-glucosidase inhibitors such as acarbose and miglitol to control diabetes mellitus type 2.

See also
 DNA glycosylases
 Mucopolysaccharidoses

References

External links
 

Hydrolases
Carbohydrates
EC 3.2